The Upaunan River is a tributary of the Enistustikweyach River in Regional County Municipality (RCM) of Eeyou Istchee James Bay (municipality) in the administrative region of the Nord-du-Québec, in Canadian province of Quebec, in Canada.

The surface of the river is usually frozen from early November to mid-May, however, safe ice circulation is generally from mid-November to mid-April.

Geography 
The main hydrographic slopes near the Upaunan River are:
North side: Dana Lake (Eeyou Istchee Baie-James), Du Tast Lake;
East side: Evans Lake, Broadback River;
South side: Enistustikweyach River, Iskaskunikaw River, Pauschikushish Ewiwach River, Chabinoche River, Soscumica Lake;
West side: Dana Lake (Eeyou Istchee Baie-James), Pauschikushish Ewiwach River, Utamikaneu River.
 
The Upaunan River has its source of a stream surrounded by marshes and located at:
 Southwest of Evans Lake;
 Northeast of the mouth of the Upaunan River;
 North of downtown Matagami.

From its source, the "Upaunan River" flows on  according to the following segments:
 northwesterly forming a northeasterly curve to a creek (from the Northeast);
 southwesterly to the mouth of the river.

Toponymy 
Of Cree origin, the toponym "Upaunan River" means: "the river of the camp of the pass".

The toponym "Upaunan River" was formalized on October 5, 1982 at the Commission de toponymie du Québec

References

See also 
James Bay
Rupert Bay
Broadback River, a watercourse
Evans Lake, a body of water
Dana Lake (Eeyou Istchee Baie-James), a body of water
Enistustikweyach River, a watercourse
List of rivers of Quebec

Rivers of Nord-du-Québec
Broadback River drainage basin
Eeyou Istchee James Bay